Manhush Raion, until May 2016 Pershotravnevyi Raion, was one of the raions of Donetsk Oblast, located in southeastern Ukraine. The administrative center of the raion was the urban-type settlement of Manhush (until 1995 Pershotravnevyi). The raion was abolished on 18 July 2020 as part of the administrative reform of Ukraine, which reduced the number of raions of Donetsk Oblast to eight, of which only five were controlled by the government. The area of the former Manhush Raion was merged into the newly created Mariupol Raion.

The militia of the Donetsk People's Republic occupied the region for a short time but was expelled by the Donbas Battalion, a paramilitary group which consists of locals from the Donbass region.

On 19 May 2016, Verkhovna Rada adopted a decision to rename Pershotravnevyi Raion to Manhush Raion according to the law prohibiting names of Communist origin.

Demographics
According to the 2001 Ukrainian Census:

References

Former raions of Donetsk Oblast
1966 establishments in Ukraine
Ukrainian raions abolished during the 2020 administrative reform